Martin Sedlák (born 4 April 2000) is a Czech footballer who currently plays as a midfielder for Kroměříž on loan from Zbrojovka Brno.

Club career

FC Zbrojovka Brno
He made his professional debut for Zbrojovka Brno in the home match against Viktoria Žižkov on 28 June 2020. He replaced Antonín Růsek in the 78th minute of the match and after 2 minutes he scored his premiere goal and helped his team to 6-1 win.

References

External links
 Profile at FC Zbrojovka Brno official site
 Profile at FAČR official site
 Profile at MSFL official site

2000 births
Living people
Czech footballers
FC Zbrojovka Brno players
Association football midfielders
People from Vyškov
Czech National Football League players
Sportspeople from the South Moravian Region